Podolí Swimming Stadium (in Czech: Plavecký stadion Podolí) is a swimming centre in Prague, Czech Republic, which is located on the right side of Vltava river in Podolí neighborhood. It contains two 50 meter-long pools (outside and inside), 33 meter pool for water polo, spa or other facilities including seating for 5000 spectators. It was built between 1959 and 1965 on the site of a former mine. Design of the complex, symbolizing a big water wave, was created by a Czech architect Richard Podzemný.

The complex had an average of around 2500 visitors daily in 2015.

References

External links 

 

Swimming venues in the Czech Republic
Sports venues completed in 1965
1965 establishments in Czechoslovakia
Prague 4
Sports venues in Prague
20th-century architecture in the Czech Republic